Andi Janette Dorfman (born April 3, 1987) is an American television personality. She was a contestant on the eighteenth season of The Bachelor, and the lead on tenth season of The Bachelorette. She became famous for walking out on bachelor Juan Pablo Galavis in the ninth episode of The Bachelor. She became the first former attorney to appear as The Bachelorette.

Early life and education
Dorfman was born in Atlanta, Georgia, the younger of two sisters. She earned a Bachelor of Science in communication from Louisiana State University in 2009 and a Juris Doctor from the Wake Forest University School of Law in 2012.

Career 
Dorfman has worked as an assistant district attorney for Fulton County, Georgia.

The Bachelor and The Bachelorette
During Juan Pablo Galavis' season of The Bachelor (season 18), Dorfman made it to the eighth episode before pulling herself from the competition.

Dorfman then starred in The Bachelorette season 10, which premiered on May 19, 2014. She took leave from her job as an assistant district attorney to be on the show. She later resigned from her position rather than ask for additional leave. Her choice as the winner was Josh Murray, to whom she became engaged in May; on January 8, 2015, Murray and Dorfman announced their decision to end their engagement.

On February 20, 2017, she made a surprise appearance on Nick Viall's season of The Bachelor; Viall had been Murray's runner-up during Dorfman's Bachelorette season and had sharply questioned her choice of Murray during the season finale. Following Dorfman's breakup with Murray, she wrote a book titled "It's Not Okay", detailing their tumultuous relationship and breakup, which was referenced by numerous contestants in season three of Bachelor in Paradise.

Personal life 
She is a cousin of actress Tommy Dorfman. She announced her engagement to Blaine Hart on March 30, 2022.

References 

1987 births
Living people

American prosecutors
Louisiana State University alumni
Wake Forest University School of Law alumni
People from Atlanta
Georgia (U.S. state) lawyers
Bachelor Nation contestants
Georgia (U.S. state) Republicans